The 2018–19 CAF Confederation Cup qualifying rounds were played from 27 November 2018 to 20 January 2019. A total of 70 teams competed in the qualifying rounds to decide the 16 places in the group stage of the 2018–19 CAF Confederation Cup.

Draw

The draw for the preliminary round and first round was held on 3 November 2018 in Rabat, Morocco, and was officially announced by the CAF on 9 November due to a special situation with the transitional calendar.

The entry round of the 55 teams entered into the draw was determined by their performances in the CAF competitions for the previous five seasons (CAF 5-Year Ranking points shown in parentheses).

Format

In the qualifying rounds, each tie was played on a home-and-away two-legged basis. If the aggregate score was tied after the second leg, the away goals rule would be applied, and if still tied, extra time would not be played, and the penalty shoot-out would be used to determine the winner (Regulations III. 13 & 14).

Schedule
The schedule of each round was as follows (matches scheduled in midweek in italics).

Bracket
The bracket of the draw was announced by the CAF on 9 November 2018.

As there were 16 winners of the Confederation Cup first round, but only 15 losers of the Champions League first round for this season, the winners of the first round with the best CAF 5-Year Ranking (in bold italics) advanced directly to the group stage. The remaining 15 winners of the first round advanced to the play-off round, where they were joined by the 15 losers of the Champions League first round.

Preliminary round
The preliminary round included the 46 teams that did not receive byes to the first round.

2–2 on aggregate. Stade d'Abidjan won on away goals.

1–1 on aggregate. AS Nyuki won 3–1 on penalties.

Petro de Luanda won 6–0 on aggregate.

AS CotonTchad won 3–1 on aggregate.

Hassania Agadir won 4–0 on aggregate.

Génération Foot won 1–0 on aggregate.

USM Bel Abbès won 4–1 on aggregate.

Enugu Rangers won 5–1 on aggregate.

3–3 on aggregate. Salitas won on away goals.

Mtibwa Sugar won 5–0 on aggregate.

DC Motema Pembe won 5–2 on aggregate.

FC San Pédro won 2–1 on aggregate.

1–1 on aggregate. Cercle Mbéri Sportif won 4–3 on penalties.

Kaizer Chiefs won 5–1 on aggregate.

ASSM Elgeco Plus won 4–3 on aggregate.

Al-Ittihad won on walkover after Miracle Club withdrew prior to the second leg.

New Star won 4–1 on aggregate.

Kariobangi Sharks won 9–1 on aggregate.

Asante Kotoko won on walkover after the Cameroonian Football Federation was not able to confirm the engagement of Eding Sport by the CAF deadline.

Mukura Victory Sports won 1–0 on aggregate.

Green Eagles won 5–2 on aggregate.

NA Hussein Dey won 3–1 on aggregate.

Green Buffaloes won 2–0 on aggregate.

First round
The first round included 32 teams: the 9 teams that received byes to this round, and the 23 winners of the preliminary round.

Étoile du Sahel won 3–1 on aggregate.

Petro de Luanda won 2–0 on aggregate.

Zamalek won 7–2 on aggregate.

Hassania Agadir won 2–1 on aggregate.

Enugu Rangers won 2–0 on aggregate.

Salitas won 2–0 on aggregate.

KCCA won 5–1 on aggregate.

FC San Pédro won 3–1 on aggregate.

Raja Casablanca won 5–1 on aggregate.

Kaizer Chiefs won 6–0 on aggregate.

RS Berkane won 4–0 on aggregate.

1–1 on aggregate. New Star won on away goals.

Asante Kotoko won 2–1 on aggregate.

0–0 on aggregate. Mukura Victory Sports won 5–4 on penalties.

NA Hussein Dey won 2–1 on aggregate.

CS Sfaxien won 4–2 on aggregate.

Play-off round
The play-off round included 30 teams: 15 of the 16 winners of the Confederation Cup first round, and the 15 losers of the Champions League first round.

The draw for the play-off round was held on 28 December 2018, 18:00 CAT (UTC+2), at the Nile Ritz-Carlton in Cairo, Egypt. The winners of the Confederation Cup first round were drawn against the losers of the Champions League first round, with the teams from the Confederation Cup hosting the second leg.

The teams were seeded by their performances in the CAF competitions for the previous five seasons (CAF 5-Year Ranking points shown in parentheses):
Pot A contained the seven seeded losers of the Champions League first round.
Pot B contained the five seeded winners of the Confederation Cup first round.
Pot C contained the eight unseeded losers of the Champions League first round.
Pot D contained the ten unseeded winners of the Confederation Cup first round.
First, a team from Pot A and a team from Pot D were drawn into seven ties. Next, a team from Pot B and a team from Pot C were drawn into five ties. Finally, the remaining teams from Pot C and Pot D were drawn into the last three ties.

The 15 winners of the play-off round advanced to the group stage to join Étoile du Sahel, who advanced directly to the group stage as the winners of the first round with the best CAF 5-Year Ranking.

Gor Mahia won 2–1 on aggregate.

NA Hussein Dey won 3–2 on aggregate.

Al-Hilal won 3–1 on aggregate.

Nkana won 3–0 on aggregate.

Asante Kotoko won 5–3 on aggregate.

ZESCO United won 5–2 on aggregate.

Petro de Luanda won 3–2 on aggregate.

Raja Casablanca won 2–1 on aggregate.

RS Berkane won 5–3 on aggregate.

CS Sfaxien won 3–0 on aggregate.

Zamalek won 3–1 on aggregate.

AS Otôho won 3–2 on aggregate.

Enugu Rangers won 4–2 on aggregate.

Salitas won 3–2 on aggregate.

Hassania Agadir won 5–0 on aggregate.

Notes

References

External links
Total Confederation Cup 2018/2019, CAFonline.com

1
November 2018 sports events in Africa
December 2018 sports events in Africa
January 2019 sports events in Africa